Sorry Enaku Kalyanamayidichu ( Sorry, I am married) is a 2005 Indian Tamil-language film directed by Sagar. It stars Sriman (in his lead debut), Swarnamalya and Flora Saini. The film was initially denied a censor certificate by the regional censor board in Chennai and was referred to the revising committee in Mumbai before it was released. It is a remake of the 2004 Telugu film Sorry Naaku Pellaindi.

Cast

 Sriman as Ashok
 Swarnamalya as Aparna
 Flora Saini as Manju
 M. S. Bhaskar as Azhagusundaram
 Chinni Jayanth as Raghu
 Chitti Babu as Murali
 Pandu as Narayanan
 Livingston as Appu
 Kunal as Vijay
 Manobala
 K. Rajan
 Muthukaalai as Pandi
 Shakeela as Baby
 Priyanka

Soundtrack

References

Tamil remakes of Telugu films
2005 films
2000s Tamil-language films
Indian erotic films